The South African Sailing is the national governing body for the sport of sailing in South Africa, recognised by World Sailing.

Famous Sailors

Sailing Clubs
 Saldanha Bay Yacht Club
 Knysna Yacht Club
 Stilbaai Yacht Club
 Redhouse Yacht Club
 Royal Cape Yacht Club
 Royal Natal Yacht Club

See also
 Sport in South Africa

References

External links
 Official website
 ISAF MNA Microsite

South Africa
Sailing
Yachting associations
Sailing governing bodies
Sailing in South Africa